Antonio Filevski (born 26 March 1966) is a retired Macedonian international football player.

Club career
He was the main goalkeeper in FK Vardar during almost the entire 1990s. The only exceptions were when he went to Portugal, for six months, in 1993, to play in Rio Ave, and, when he went, another six months, to Belgium, in 1996, to play in KV Mechelen. Since 1998, he played mostly in Serbia, first in FK Železnik for two seasons, and afterward, already before retiring, in the 1997/98 FR Yugoslav Champions FK Obilić. In between he had a six months spell in FK Belasica from Strumica.

International career
Antonio had his first calls to play in the North Macedonia national football team while still playing in FK Vardar, in the still early stages of the national team. He made his senior debut for the team in a May 1996 friendly match against Bulgaria and has earned a total of 10 caps, scoring no goals. He was regular choice all until his retirement in 2001.

Honours
Vardar Skopje
Macedonian First League: 3
Winner: 1992–93, 1993–94, 1994–95
Macedonian Cup: 3
Winner: 1992–93, 1994–95, 1997–98

References

External links

1966 births
Living people
Footballers from Skopje
Association football goalkeepers
Macedonian footballers
North Macedonia international footballers
FK Vardar players
Rio Ave F.C. players
K.V. Mechelen players
FK Železnik players
FK Belasica players
FK Obilić players
Yugoslav First League players
Yugoslav Second League players
Liga Portugal 2 players
Macedonian First Football League players
Belgian Pro League players
First League of Serbia and Montenegro players
Macedonian expatriate footballers
Expatriate footballers in Portugal
Macedonian expatriate sportspeople in Portugal
Expatriate footballers in Belgium
Macedonian expatriate sportspeople in Belgium
Expatriate footballers in Serbia and Montenegro
Macedonian expatriate sportspeople in Serbia and Montenegro